St Mary's Church is a Grade I listed parish church in the Church of England in Stoke-by-Nayland.

History

The earliest parts of the church date from the late 13th century or early 14th century and comprise the south porch, St Edmund's Chapel (ca. 1318) and some of the aisle wall. The remainder was rebuilt in the 15th century

The church is noted for the south porch with its groin vaulted roof, restored carved bosses . and priests chamber above. The South door is a Jesse tree, carved with figures, birds and insects.

The tower is 126 feet (38 metres) high to the top of the pinnacles.

Memorials

The church has a number of 15th century brasses and a wall monument to Sir Francis Mannock, 1st Baronet, of Giffords Hall (d 1634).

Parish status

The church is in a group of parishes which includes:
 St Matthew's Church, Leavenheath
 St Mary's Church, Polstead

Organ

The church has a two manual pipe organ the origins of which are from an organ of around 1834 by Gray. There has been subsequent renovations and alterations by Gray and Davison, Henry Jones, Rayson and Bishop and Son. A specification of the organ can be found on the National Pipe Organ Register.

Bells 
The tower contains 8 bells with a tenor weight of 22cwt in D. Details on the bells as follows:

References

Church of England church buildings in Suffolk
Grade I listed churches in Suffolk
Stoke-by-Nayland